The 2008–09 EIHL season was the sixth season of the Elite Ice Hockey League. It began in September 2008, and ran through to April 2009. The ten clubs in the League competed for 4 different competitions: the Elite League, the Play-Offs, the Challenge Cup, and the Knockout Cup. The winners of the regular season will compete in the 2009–2010 Champions Hockey League.  For this season, the Coventry Blaze represented Great Britain in the Continental Cup.

Charity Shield
The season began on September 3, 2008, with a "Charity Shield" game between the 2007–08 league champions and Knockout Cup winning Coventry Blaze and the playoff champions Sheffield Steelers at the SkyDome. The Blaze narrowly beat the Steelers 5–4 in sudden death overtime.

Challenge Cup
For the preliminary round, teams were divided into two groups of five with teams playing each of their opponents once with two homes games and two away games. The home and away games for each club were determined by a random draw. The top two in each group advanced to the semi finals of the competition.

Group stage

Group A

Group B

Semi-finals

Coventry Blaze 1 - 1 Belfast Giants (1st Leg)

Belfast Giants 4 - 1 Coventry Blaze (2nd Leg)

Belfast Win 5 - 2 on Aggregate

Basingstoke Bison 2 - 5 Manchester Phoenix (1st Leg)

Manchester Phoenix 6 - 1 Basingstoke Bison (2nd Leg)

Manchester Win 11 - 3 on Aggregate

Final

Manchester Phoenix 4 - 3 Belfast Giants

Belfast Giants 3 - 1 Manchester Phoenix

Belfast Giants win 6 - 5 on aggregate

Elite League Table

Elite League Playoffs

All-star game
On February 19th, 2009, the SkyDome in Coventry staged the 2009 EIHL All-Star Game. This game was played out between the North All-Stars and the South All-Stars. Dave Matsos of the Sheffield Steelers was chosen to coach the North, while Paul Thompson of the Coventry Blaze was chosen to coach the South. The rosters for each team consisted of players representing all 10 Elite League clubs.

Footnotes

Elite Ice Hockey League seasons
1
United